A fifer is a non-combatant military occupation of a foot soldier who originally played the fife during combat. The practice was instituted during the period of Early Modern warfare to sound signals during changes in formation, such as the line, and were also members of the regiment's military band during marches. 

These soldiers, often boys too young to fight or sons of NCOs, were used to help infantry battalions to keep marching pace from the right of the formation in coordination with the drummers positioned at the centre, and relayed orders in the form of sequences of musical signals. The fife was particularly useful because of its high pitched sound, which could be heard over the sounds of battle. Fifers were present in numerous wars of note, as Armies of the 18th and 19th centuries "depended on company fifers and drummers for communicating orders during battle, regulating camp formations and duties, and providing music for marching, ceremonies, and moral."

The usual allocation of fifers in a battalion during the Early Modern warfare period varied from five to eight. The field music regimental bands, particularly of the high prestige units such as the guards had as many as 32 (in the Preobrazhensky regiment) or more fifers. Some fifers, as part of the fife and drum corps that accompanied British Captain Arthur Phillip and the First Fleet, were present at important Australian, such as the reading of the Governor's Commission on 2 February 1788 at Sydney Cove. Fifers were also present in the American Revolutionary War, although there were at times shortages of fifers that were "fit for duty." This staffing dilemma lead to the creation of a "learner" fifer category, which were drawn from within the revolutionary ranks rather than externally recruited.

References

Sources
 Nafziger, George, The Russian Army 1800-1815, Rafm Co.Inc., Cambridge, Ontario, Canada, 1983
 http://www.cultureandrecreation.gov.au/articles/music/military/  Military music

See also
Drummer
Flag bearer
Pfeiffer
 
Combat occupations
Obsolete occupations
Occupations in music